Semaphore is the use of an apparatus with telegraphy to create a visual signal transmitted over long-distances. 

It may refer more specifically to:
 Flag semaphore
 Semaphore telegraph, a system of long-distance communication based on towers with moving arms
 Railway semaphore signal for railway traffic control
 Traffic semaphore, another name for automotive traffic lights based on their early resemblance to railway semaphores
 Turning semaphore or trafficators, retractable arms to indicate turns on automobiles from the 1920s to 1950s

Other
 Semaphore (programming), in computer science, a mechanism for supporting mutual exclusion in concurrent programs
 Semaphore (software), a continuous integration testing utility
 Semaphore, South Australia, a historic seaside suburb of Adelaide
 Semaphore railway line, Adelaide, a closed railway line in South Australia
 Semaphore Corporation (company), a software and publishing firm that operated from 1982 to 2017
 Semaphore (album), a 1998 album by Fridge
 "Semaphore" (song), a 2004 single by the New Zealand band Jakob
 Semaphore, fictional professor in Cubitus comic strips or Wowser cartoons

See also
 International maritime signal flags, one system of flag signals representing individual letters of the alphabet in signals to or from ships
 Telegraphy, the long-distance transmission of written messages without physical transport of written letters